Empedrado is a town and commune in the Talca Province of Chile's Maule Region.

Demographics
Of these, 2,499 (59.1%) lived in urban areas and 1,726 (40.9%) in rural areas. The population fell by 7.2% (329 persons) between the 1992 and 2002 censuses.

Administration
As a commune, Empedrado is a third-level administrative division of Chile administered by a municipal council, headed by an alcalde who is directly elected every four years. The 2008-2012 alcalde is Gonzalo Tejos Perez.

Within the electoral divisions of Chile, Empedrado is represented in the Chamber of Deputies by Pablo Lorenzini (PDC) and Pedro Pablo Alvarez-Salamanca (UDI) as part of the 38th electoral district, together with Curepto, Constitución, Pencahue, Maule, San Clemente, Pelarco, Río Claro and San Rafael. The commune is represented in the Senate by Juan Antonio Coloma Correa (UDI) and Andrés Zaldívar Larraín (PDC) as part of the 10th senatorial constituency (Maule-North).

References

External links
  Municipality of Empedrado

Populated places in Talca Province
Communes of Chile